Hydriomena purpurifera is a species of moth in the family Geometridae. It was first described by Richard William Fereday in 1883. This species is endemic to New Zealand. The classification of New Zealand endemic moths within the genus Hydriomena is regarded as unsatisfactory and in need of revision. As such this species is currently also known as Hydriomena (s.l.) purpurifera.

References 

Sterrhinae
Moths described in 1883
Moths of New Zealand
Endemic fauna of New Zealand
Taxa named by Richard William Fereday
Endemic moths of New Zealand